Simcoe—Grey is a federal electoral district in Ontario, Canada, that has been represented in the House of Commons of Canada since 1997.

It was created in 1996 from parts of Barrie—Simcoe—Bradford, Bruce—Grey, Simcoe Centre, Simcoe North, Wellington—Grey—Dufferin—Simcoe and York—Simcoe.

It consists of the municipalities of Blue Mountains, Collingwood, Clearview, Wasaga Beach, Springwater, Essa, New Tecumseth and Adjala-Tosorontio.  It had a population of 117,505 in 2001, and an area of 2,515 km².

History

It consisted initially of:
 the part of the County of Simcoe lying to the west of and including the Town of New Tecumseth and the Township of Essa, to the west of and excluding the City of Barrie, to the east of and including the townships of Vespra and Flos, and to the south of and excluding the Township of Tiny;
 in the County of Grey, the Town of Thornbury, the villages of Flesherton and Markdale, and the townships of Artemesia, Collingwood and Osprey.

In 2003, it was given its current boundaries as described above.

This riding lost territory to Barrie—Springwater—Oro-Medonte during the 2012 electoral redistribution.

Riding associations

Riding associations are the local branches of the national political parties:

Members of Parliament

This riding has elected the following Members of Parliament:

Election results

					
		

Note: Conservative vote is compared to the total of the Canadian Alliance vote and Progressive Conservative vote in 2000 election.

Note: Canadian Alliance vote is compared to the Reform vote in 1997 election.

See also
 List of Canadian federal electoral districts
 Past Canadian electoral districts

References

Riding history from the Library of Parliament
 2011 results from Elections Canada
 Campaign expense data from Elections Canada

Notes

External links
Jim Wilson, MPP
Christian Heritage Party Simcoe-Grey
Simcoe-Grey Green Party
Simcoe-Grey Federal Liberal Riding Association
Simcoe-Grey NDP Riding Association

Ontario federal electoral districts
Collingwood, Ontario